Lanvénégen is a commune in the Morbihan department of Brittany in north-western France.

Geography

Historically, Lanvénégen belongs to Cornouaille. The river Ellé forms the eastern border of the commune. Apart from the village centre, there are about eighty hamlets. Most of the hamlets consist of two or three houses but others are larger like the villages of Vetveur, Lanzonnet and Quinquis.

Neighbouring communes

Lanvénégen is border by Meslan to east, by Le Faouët to north, by Guiscriff to west and by Querrien to south.

Demographics
Inhabitants of Lanvénégen are called in French Lanvénégenois. Lanvénégen's population peaked at 2,790 in 1926 and declined to 1,144 in 2019. This represents a 59.0% decrease in total population since the peak census figure.

Map

List of places

History

In 1508, the construction of the current parish church dedicated to Saint Cognogan began. Bertrand du Rusquec, who initiated the work, was its first minister before being appointed rector of Guiscriff in 1514. The oldest surviving parish registers date back to 1637.

See also
Communes of the Morbihan department

References

External links

 Mayors of Morbihan Association 

Communes of Morbihan